Conor Grant is the name of:

Conor Grant (footballer, born 1995), English footballer for Plymouth Argyle.
Conor Grant (footballer, born 2001), English footballer for Rochdale.